Oak View Mall is an enclosed shopping mall located at 3002 South 145th Street in West Omaha, Nebraska. There are 104 tenant spots on two floors of this regional mall, which was built in 1991. The mall receives more than 12,000,000 visitors annually, and features a "Kids Coliseum" play area. Oak View is attributed with sparking a development "boom" in its approximate neighborhood, which now includes several major retailers, restaurants, a three national hotel chains. The mall's anchor stores are Dillard's, JCPenney and The Rush Market. There is one vacant anchor that formerly housed a Sears.

History 
The mall opened in 1991. Official opening ceremonies held on October 3 of that year, and included an appearance by Vanna White. At the time, the  mall was the first enclosed mall to be built in Omaha in over 20 years. Melvin Simon & Associates (now known as Simon Property Group) developed the mall with local developer KVI Associates. After only one year, Simon sold the mall to Heitman Retail. Sears began negotiations to open at the mall in 1996.

In 2005 the mall was the location of an attempted mall shooting similar to what happened at Westroads Mall in Omaha in December 2007. A security guard supervisor was allegedly fired for disarming and apprehending a suspected mall shooter before Omaha police were called to the scene. In August 2007 the Firefighter's Combat Challenge was held at the mall and broadcast on ESPN.

Recent History 
Shoe Dept. Encore opened a store in the mall in 2013. In 2015-2016, Wet Seal, Eddie Bauer, Deb Shops, Aéropostale, and Hollister Co. closed stores at the mall. In 2016, Payless ShoeSource and Vanity (clothing) closed their stores at the mall as part of a nationwide bankruptcy liquidation. In 2018, both the Sears and Younkers stores closed at the mall. In 2019, a The Rush Market Furniture Store assumed the vacant Younkers space. Due to the Covid 19 pandemic the occupancy rate has declined to 79%, as of October 2020. The mall in April 2021 was sold for $7.5 million to the Kohan Retail Investment Group.

References

1992 establishments in Nebraska
Shopping malls established in 1991
Shopping malls in Omaha, Nebraska
 Kohan Retail Investment Group